Jacob Wills House is an eighteenth-century Flemish "checkerboard" brick farmhouse, located in the Evans Corner section of Evesham Township, Burlington County, New Jersey, United States.

It was built in 1789 and added to the National Register of Historic Places in 1990.

See also
National Register of Historic Places listings in Burlington County, New Jersey

References

Evesham Township, New Jersey
National Register of Historic Places in Burlington County, New Jersey
New Jersey Register of Historic Places
1789 establishments in New Jersey